Onchidoris macropompa is a species of sea slug, a dorid nudibranch, a shell-less marine gastropod mollusc in the family Onchidorididae.

Distribution
This species was described from Starichkov Island, Kamchatka Peninsula on the Pacific Ocean coast of Russia. Additional specimens from Medny Island were included in the original description.

References

Onchidorididae
Gastropods described in 2009